Brian David Outram Anderson  (born 15 January 1941) is Professor in the Research School of Information Sciences and Engineering at the Australian National University. His research interests include circuits, signal processing and control, and his current work focuses on distributed control of multi-agent systems, sensor network localization, adaptive and non-linear control. Professor Anderson served as President of the Australian Academy of Science from 1998 to 2002.

Anderson was elected as a member into the National Academy of Engineering in 2002 for his contributions to system and control theory, and for international leadership in promoting engineering science and technology.

Dianne Anderson is Brian's wife. They both live in Canberra.

Education
Anderson received a BS (1962) in mathematics and BE (1964) in electrical engineering from the University of Sydney and a PhD (1966) in electrical engineering from Stanford, under Robert W. Newcomb.

Awards and honours
 1992 – Matthew Flinders Medal and Lecture
 1992 – Hendrik W. Bode Lecture Prize
 1993 – Officer of the Order of Australia
 1997 – IEEE Control Systems Award
 1999 – Giorgio Quazza Medal
 2001 – IEEE James H. Mulligan, Jr. Education Medal
 2001 – Centenary Medal (Australia)
 2002  – M A Sargent Medal 
 2007 – Order of the Rising Sun, Gold Rays with Neck Ribbon (Japan)
 2016 – Companion of the Order of Australia

Membership of learned societies
 1974 – Australian Academy of Science, Fellow.
 1975 – Institute of Electrical and Electronics Engineers, Fellow.
 1980 – Australian Academy of Technological Sciences and Engineering, Fellow.
 1985 – Institution of Engineers Australia, Honorary Fellow.
 1989 – Royal Society, London, Fellow.
 2002 – National Academy of Engineering, USA, Foreign Associate.
 2005 – International Federation of Automatic Control, Fellow.

References

External links 
 Author profile in the database zbMATH

1941 births
Living people
Academic staff of the Australian National University
Companions of the Order of Australia
Officers of the Order of Australia
Fellows of the Australian Academy of Science
Fellows of the Australian Academy of Technological Sciences and Engineering
Fellows of the Royal Society
Recipients of the Order of the Rising Sun
Fellow Members of the IEEE
Presidents of the Australian Academy of Science
Recipients of the M. A. Sargent Medal
Foreign associates of the National Academy of Engineering